Joonas Rönnberg (born February 19, 1983) is a Finnish professional ice hockey defenceman. He currently plays for HC Ludwig in Vantaa, Finland. He previously played for Sheffield Steelers of the UK's Elite Ice Hockey League (EIHL).

Rönnberg made his Swedish Hockey League debut playing with Leksands IF during the 2013–14 SHL season. After four seasons with Leksands, Ronnberg left as a free agent to sign a one-year contract in Germany with Düsseldorfer EG of the DEL on May 26, 2015.

In June 2017, Rönnberg moved to the UK to sign for EIHL side the Sheffield Steelers on a one-year contract.

References

External links

1983 births
Living people
Düsseldorfer EG players
Espoo Blues players
Finnish ice hockey defencemen
Ilves players
Kiekko-Vantaa players
Leksands IF players
IK Oskarshamn players
SaiPa players
Storhamar Dragons players
Sheffield Steelers players
Sportspeople from Vantaa
Finnish expatriate ice hockey players in Sweden
Finnish expatriate ice hockey players in Norway
Finnish expatriate ice hockey players in England
Finnish expatriate ice hockey players in Germany